Maria Sid-Achrén (née Maria Sid, born 13 May 1968) is a Finnish actress. She is best known for her role in the Finnish satire television program Donna Paukku. Sid lives and works in Finland and Sweden.

Filmography 
 Akvaariorakkaus (1993) .... Morsian
 Nainen kedolla (2003) .... Liisa Veräjä
 Operation Stella Polaris (2003) .... Anna Höglund
 Fling (2004) .... Camilla
 Onnen varjot (2005) .... Nainen luokkajuhlissa
 Reunion (2015) .... vastaanottovirkailija

Television 
 Kätevä emäntä (2004)
 Vasikantanssi (2004) .... Minna Vuorinen
 Kirkkaalta taivaalta (2006) .... Mimmu
 Donna Paukku (2006–2007) .... Donna Paukku
 Karjalan kunnailla (2007, 2009) .... Kirsti Miettinen
 The Moomins (2007–2008) .... Moominmamma (Swedish version) 
 Livet i Fagervik (2008) .... Annika
 Crimes of Passion (2013)
 Moomins on the Riviera (2014) .... Moominmamma (Finnish/Swedish versions)
 Moomins and the Winter Wonderland (2017) .... Moominmamma (Finnish version)
 All the Sins (2019)
 Moominvalley (2019) .... Moominmamma (Swedish version)

References

External links 

Finnish actresses
Swedish-speaking Finns
1968 births
Living people
Finnish expatriates in Sweden